Cameron Lindsay (born 15 October 1991) is a South African rugby union player for the Rovigo Delta in the Italian Top10. His regular position is lock.

Career

Youth

Lindsay attended Michaelhouse school in KwaZulu-Natal and played for their Under-18 side at the 2009 Craven Week tournament. In 2010, he moved to Cape Town to join . He made twelve appearances for the  side that won the 2010 Under-19 Provincial Championship competition, although Lindsay was an unused substitute in the final.

In 2012, he was included in the  squad for the 2012 Under-21 Provincial Championship, but failed to play for them. He did however play some club rugby for university side  in the Western Province Super League in 2012. He was named in their squad for the 2013 Varsity Cup, but once again failed to make any appearances.

He started five of their matches to help them to the semi-final of the competition.

Senior career

Lindsay's performances in the 2014 Varsity Cup also earned him an inclusion in the  squad for the 2014 Vodacom Cup competition. He retained his spot in the starting line-up for their next match against , where he scored his first senior try.

In June 2014, he was selected in the starting line-up for the  side to face  during a tour match during a 2014 incoming tour. He played the entire match as the Kings suffered a 12–34 defeat.

International career

In May 2019 he was included in a preliminary 23-men squad for the Germany national team. His name was suggested to the German coach Mike Ford by another fellow South African coaching the German Sevens team, Vuyo Zangqa.

Lindsay has yet to make an appearance for the Springboks.

References

1991 births
Living people
Eastern Province Elephants players
Griquas (rugby union) players
Pumas (Currie Cup) players
Rugby union players from Pretoria
South African rugby union players
Alumni of Michaelhouse
Rugby union locks
Rugby Rovigo Delta players